Ernesto Bernardo Álvarez Terojín (August 10, 1928 in Fuentes – September 27, 2010 in Buenos Aires) was an Argentine and Chilean football striker. He played club football in Argentina and Chile.

Álvarez played youth football for América de Funtes and Rosario Central before joining Banfield in 1948. He went on to make 152 appearances for the club, scoring 56 goals.

In 1957 he moved to Chile toplay for Green Cross and in 1959 he joined Universidad de Chile where he became an important member of the team that became known as the "Ballet Azul" (Blue Ballet). He won four league championship titles with the club and is still one of the top scoring players in the history of the club with 82 goals in 190 games.

In 1963 he gained Chilean citizenship and played one game for the Chile national team against Uruguay in the "Copa Juan Pinto Durán".

Álvarez left "La U" in 1965 and returned to Green Cross, who had changed their name to Green Cross Temuco, he played his final season in 1967 for Audax Italiano.

Honours

Club
Universidad de Chile
 Primera División de Chile: 1959, 1962, 1964 and 1965

External links
 Universidad de Chile profile 
 Ernesto Álvarez at BDFA.com.ar 
  

1928 births
2010 deaths
People from San Lorenzo Department
Argentine footballers
Chilean footballers
Chile international footballers
Argentine expatriate footballers
Association football forwards
Club Atlético Banfield footballers
Audax Italiano footballers
Club de Deportes Green Cross footballers
Universidad de Chile footballers
Deportes Temuco footballers
Expatriate footballers in Chile
Argentine expatriate sportspeople in Chile
Argentine Primera División players
Chilean Primera División players
Argentine emigrants to Chile
Naturalized citizens of Chile
Sportspeople from Santa Fe Province